Arribes may refer to:

Geography

 Arribes (geography), the banks of the rivers in the southeast of the province of Zamora and the northeast of the province of Salamanca, Castile and León, Spain.
 La Ribera de Salamanca (also named Las Arribes), a historic-traditional comarca in the province of Salamanca, Castile and León, Spain.
 Arribes del Duero Natural Park, a protected area in the southeast of the province of Zamora and the northeast of the province of Salamanca, Castile and León, Spain.
 Mancomunidad Arribes del Duero, a mancomunidad of the province of Salamanca, Castile and León, Spain.

Gastronomy

 Arribes (wine), a wine denominación de origen of the province of Zamora and the province of Salamanca, Castile and León, Spain.
 Queso Arribes de Salamanca, a cheese marca de garantía of the province of Salamanca, Castile and León, Spain.